Sam Brown is an American politician and former military person.

Early life and family
Brown was born in Arkansas in a military family with a father and two younger brothers who also served in the Global War on Terror after September 11, 2001. He was educated at the United States Military Academy at West Point and graduated in 2006. He also holds a Master of Business Administration (MBA) from Southern Methodist University.

In May 2009, he married Amy Larsen, an Army first lieutenant from South Dakota and critical care dietitian who worked in the Department of Defense Burn Center at Brooke Army Medical Center in San Antonio.

Career
After completing his training from the United States Army Infantry School, Ranger School, and Airborne School, he joined 3rd Brigade Combat Team, 1st Infantry Division at Fort Hood, Texas.

In 2008, he was deployed to Kandahar, Afghanistan. Later, in September 2008, while supporting the multinational cooperative project of delivering a turbine to the Kajaki Dam he and his soldiers were wounded by an improvised explosive device when responding to another US Army unit was ambushed and in a direct fire. As a result, thirty percent of his body was burnt, including lost of left index finger. Before the incident, he was serving in the U.S. Army as an Infantry Platoon Leader in Kandahar, Afghanistan. Later, he was evacuated and was taken to Brooke Army Medical Center in San Antonio, Texas. Due to this event, he is sometimes called Burning Man.

In 2011, he was retired as a Captain from the U.S. Army.

In 2022, he ran against Adam Laxalt in the Republican primary for the Nevada Senate election. Previously, he ran for Texas Legislature as a candidate in 2013.

Awards
 Bronze Star Medal
 Purple Heart

References

Living people
Military personnel from Arkansas
Purple Heart
Southern Methodist University alumni
United States Army officers
United States Military Academy alumni
Year of birth missing (living people)